Old Parish Church may refer to the following churches in Scotland:

 Govan Old Parish Church
 Hamilton Old Parish Church
 Lesmahagow Old Parish Church
 Old Parish Church of Peebles
 Peterhead Old Parish Church

See also
Parish church